Pavel Narõškin (born 12 June 1992) is an Estonian swimmer.

He was born in Narva. In 2014 he graduated from University of Tartu's Institute of Physical Education.

He began his swimming career in 1999. His coaches have been Vladimir Uhhov and Kaja Haljaste. He is multiple-times Estonian champion in different swimming disciplines. 2008–2014 he was a member of Estonian national swimming team.

Since 2017 he is a coach at Orca Swim Club.

References

Living people
1992 births
Estonian male butterfly swimmers
Estonian male freestyle swimmers
University of Tartu alumni
Sportspeople from Narva
Estonian people of Russian descent
21st-century Estonian people